Michael W. Twomey is an American medievalist.

Twomey earned his doctorate at Cornell University in 1979. He later joined the Ithaca College faculty, where he held the Charles A. Dana Professorship of Humanities and Arts. Upon retirement, he was granted emeritus status.

Selected publications

References

Living people
Year of birth missing (living people)
Ithaca College faculty
Cornell University alumni
American medievalists